The  information given is about the list of summits of the South Asian Association for Regional Cooperation (SAARC). Although the SAARC Charter requires  approximately every eighteenth months. Member countries of SAARC include: 
1. India
2. Bhutan
3. Sri Lanka
4. Maldives
5. Pakistan
6. Bangladesh
7. Nepal
8. Afghanistan

Member nations

Summits of SAARC

First summit 1st   Bangladesh

The first summit was held in Dhaka, Bangladesh on 7–8 December 1985 and was attended by the Government representative and president of Bangladesh, Maldives, Pakistan and Sri Lanka, the kings of Bhutan and Nepal, and the Prime Minister of India. signed the SAARC Charter on 8 December 1985, thereby establishing the regional association, and established study groups on the problems of terrorism and drug trafficking, as well as planning a ministerial-level meeting about GATT, and a ministerial-level conference on increasing the participation of women at the regional level. The summit also agreed to establish a SAARC secretariat and adopted an official SAARC emblem.

Second summit 2nd  India
The second summit was held in November 17–18 Bangalore, India in 1986. The Heads of State or Government welcomed the signing of the Memorandum of Understanding on the establishment of the SAARC Secretariat by the Council of Ministers and their decision to locate the Secretariat in Kathmandu and appoint Ambassador Abul Ahsan of Bangladesh as the first Secretary-General of south Asian association of regional cooperation.

Third summit 3rd   Nepal
The third summit was held in Kathmandu, Nepal from 2–4 November 1987, and was attended by the Presidents of Bangladesh, the Maldives and Sri Lanka, the Prime Ministers of India and Pakistan, and the kings of Bhutan and Nepal. The foreign ministers of the member states signed the SAARC Regional Convention on Suppression of Terrorism and an agreement to establish a South Asian Food Reserve.

Fourth summit 4th  Pakistan
The fourth summit was held in Islamabad, Pakistan on 29–31 December 1988 and was attended by the presidents of Bangladesh, the Maldives and Sri Lanka, the prime ministers of India and Pakistan, and the kings of Bhutan and Nepal. The summit discussed the coup attempt on 3 November 1988, declared 1989 to be the "SAARC Year Against Drug Abuse", declared 1990 to be the "SAARC Year of the Girl Child", set up a technical committee on education, and launched a regional plan called "SAARC-2000-A Basic Needs Perspective" to meet specific targets by the end of the twentieth century in areas such as food, shelter, education and environmental protection. It was also agreed to hold regular "South Asian Festivals" with the first being hosted by India.

Fifth summit 5th  Maldives
The fifth summit was held in Malé, Maldives on 21–23 November 1990 and was attended by the presidents of Bangladesh, the Maldives and Sri Lanka, the prime ministers of India, Nepal and Pakistan, and the king of Bhutan. The leaders signed the SAARC Convention on Narcotic Drugs and Psychotropic Substances, launched the Special SAARC Travel Document (providing visa-exemptions for national judges, parliamentarians and academics and their immediate families), launched a Scheme for the Promotion of Organised Tourism, authorized the SAARC secretariat to share information and exchange reports, studies and publications with the European Community and the Association of South East Asian Nations, declared various SAARC years (1991-2000 AD) to be the "SAARC Decade of the Girl Child", 1991 to be the "SAARC Year of Shelter", 1992 to be the "SAARC Year of the Environment", 1993 to be the "SAARC Year of Disabled Persons", and decided to set up the SAARC

Sixth summit 6th  Sri Lanka
The sixth summit was held in Colombo, Sri Lanka on 21 December 1991 and was attended by the prime ministers of Bangladesh, India, Nepal and Pakistan, the presidents of the Maldives and Sri Lanka, and the king of Bhutan.That was the year of shelter.

Seventh summit 7th  Bangladesh
The seventh summit was held in Dhaka, on 10–11 April 1992 but was postponed and was attended by the presidents of the Maldives and Sri Lanka, the prime ministers of Bangladesh, India, Nepal and Pakistan, and the king of Bhutan in 1993.

Eighth summit 8th  India
The eighth summit was held in New Delhi, on 2–4 May 1995, and was attended by the presidents of the Maldives, Pakistan and Sri Lanka, the prime ministers of Bangladesh, India and Nepal, and the king of Bhutan.

Ninth summit 9th  Maldives
The ninth summit was held in Malé, on 12–14 May 1997, and was attended by the presidents of the Maldives and Sri Lanka, the prime ministers of Bangladesh, India, Nepal and Pakistan, and the king of Bhutan.

Tenth summit 10th  Sri Lanka
The tenth summit was held in Colombo, on 29–31 July 1998, and was attended by the presidents of the Maldives and Sri Lanka and the prime ministers of Bangladesh, Bhutan, India, Nepal and Pakistan.SAARC countries stressed for eradicating poverty and promoting joint collaboration.

Eleventh summit 11th   Nepal
The eleventh summit was held in Kathmandu, on 4–6 January 2002, and was attended by the presidents of the Maldives, Pakistan and Sri Lanka and the prime ministers of Bangladesh, Bhutan, India and Nepal.

Twelfth summit 12th  Pakistan
The twelfth summit was held in Islamabad, on 4–6 January 2004, and was attended by the presidents of the Maldives and Sri Lanka and the prime ministers of Bangladesh, Bhutan, India, Nepal and Pakistan.

Thirteenth summit 13th  Bangladesh
The thirteenth summit was held in Dhaka, on 12–13 November 2005, and was attended by the prime ministers of Bangladesh, Bhutan, India and Pakistan, the presidents of the Maldives and Sri Lanka, and the king of Nepal and  Bhutan attended the summit peacefully

Fourteenth summit 14th  India
The fourteenth summit of SAARC was held in New Delhi, India on 3rd-4 April 2007, and was attended by the presidents of Afghanistan, the Maldives and Sri Lanka and the prime ministers Bhutan, INDIA, Nepal and Pakistan and the chief adviser of the government of Bangladesh. The summit stressed on improving  intra-regional connectivity.

Fifteenth summit 15th   Sri Lanka
The fifteenth summit of SAARC was held in Colombo, Sri Lanka on 1–3 August 2008. The issues discussed were regional cooperation, partnership for growth for the peoples of South Asia, connectivity, energy, the environment, water resources, poverty alleviation, the SAARC Development Fund, transport, information and communications technology development, science and technology, tourism, culture, the South Asian Free Trade Area, the SAARC Social Charter, women and children, education, combating terrorism, and the admission of Australia and Myanmar as observers.

Food security
At the summit, one of the major points of discussion was the global food crisis. The SAARC heads of government made a statement saying "in view of the emerging global situation of reduced food availability and worldwide rise in food prices, we direct that an Extra-ordinary Meeting of the Agriculture Ministers of the SAARC Member States be convened in New Delhi, India in November 2008, to evolve and implement people-centred short to medium term regional strategy and collaborative projects." They also acknowledged the need to forge greater cooperation with the international community to ensure the food availability and nutrition security.

Sixteenth summit 16th   Bhutan
The sixteenth summit was held in Thimphu, Bhutan on 28–29 April 2010. Bhutan hosted the SAARC summit for the first time. This was marked the silver jubilee celebration of SAARC that was formed in Bangladesh in December 1985. Climate change was the central issue of the summit with summit's theme "Towards a Green and Happy South Asia". Outcome of Thimphu Summit regarding climate change issue:
SAARC leaders signed a SAARC Convention on Cooperation on Environment to tackle the problem of climate change.
The SAARC nations also pledged to plant 10 million trees over the next 5 years.
India proposed setting up of climate innovation centres in South Asia to develop sustainable energy technologies.
India offered services of India's mission on sustaining the Himalayan Ecosystem to the SAARC member states saying that the initiative could serve as a nucleus for regional cooperation in this vital area.
India announced "India endowment for climate change" in South Asia to help member states meet their urgent adaption and capacity building needs posed by the climate change.
The seven-page ‘Thimphu Silver Jubilee Declaration-Towards a Green and Happy South Asia’ emphasised the importance of reducing dependence on high-carbon technologies for economic growth and hoped promotion of climate resilience will promote both development and poverty eradication in a sustainable manner.

Seventeenth summit 17th   Maldives

  
The Seventeenth Summit was held from 10-11 of November 2011 in Addu City, Maldives. The Meeting, which was held at the Equatorial Convention Centre, Addu City was opened by the outgoing Chair of SAARC, Prime Minister of the Royal Government of Bhutan, H.E.Lyonchhen Jigmi Yoezer Thinley.

H.E. Mohamed Nasheed was elected as the Chairperson of the 17th SAARC Summit. In his inaugural address President Nasheed highlighted three areas of cooperation in which progress should be made; trade, transport and economic integration; security issues such piracy and climate change; and good governance. The President also called on the Member States to establish a commission to address issues of gender inequalities in South Asia.

The Head of States of all the SAARC Member States addressed the Meeting. The inaugural meeting was attended by Foreign/External Ministers of SAARC Member States, the Secretary General of SAARC, the Heads of Observer Delegation, Cabinet Ministers of the Maldives, Ministers in the visiting delegations and other state dignitaries.

In her address Secretary General stated that the Summit being held under the theme of "Building Bridges" provides further impetus and momentum to build the many bridges that needs to be built: from bridging the gaps created by uneven economic development and income distribution, the gaps in recognizing and respecting the equality of men and women, the closing of space between intent and implementation.

In this Meeting, the Foreign Ministers of the respective Member States signed four agreements:

SAARC Agreement on Rapid Response to Natural Disasters
SAARC Agreement on Multilateral Arrangement on Recognition of Conformity Assessment
SAARC Agreement on Implementation of Regional Standards
SAARC Seed Bank Agreement

In addition, the Addu Declaration of the Seventeenth SAARC Summit was adopted.

Eighteenth summit 18th    Nepal 

The 18th SAARC Summit was held at the Nepalese capital Kathmandu from November 26 to November 27, 2014 and was attended by the prime ministers of Bangladesh, Bhutan, India, Nepal and Pakistan, and the presidents of the Afghanistan, Maldives and Sri Lanka. The motto was ‘Deeper Integration for Peace and Prosperity’. The legal permission on SAARC Satellite Scheme in this summit. The scheme will be developed in all member nations except Bangladesh and Pakistan.

Nineteenth summit 19th   Pakistan

Pakistan was scheduled to host the 19th summit of South Asian Association for Regional Cooperation (SAARC) in Islamabad on 15 to 16 November 2016.

Following the 2016 Uri terror attack, India cancelled its participation in the 19th SAARC summit, alleging Pakistan's involvement in the terror attack.

Pakistani Prime Minister Nawaz Sharif in his address to the 19th SAARC summit being held in the Pakistan’s capital, said that the objective of this summit was to address the security issues between India and Pakistan. Hours after Indian PM Narendra Modi decided to boycott the SAARC Summit in Islamabad in the wake of Uri terror attack Bangladesh, Afghanistan, Bhutan, Maldives and Sri Lanka had also pulled out of the summit.

References

10th SAARC International Psychiatric Conference 2017
SaarcPcycon2017
Visit: http://www.saarcpsycon.com/

External links

 
Diplomacy-related lists
Asia-related lists